This is a list of life peerages in the Peerage of the United Kingdom created under the Life Peerages Act 1958 from 1979 to 1997, during the tenures of the Conservative prime ministers Margaret Thatcher and John Major.



Margaret Thatcher (1979–1990)

‡ former MP  # former MEP

John Major (1990–1997)

‡ former MP  # former MEP

See also
 List of life peerages (complete list of life peerages granted since 1958)
 List of hereditary peers in the House of Lords by virtue of a life peerage

References

Notes

1979-1997
1970s in the United Kingdom
1980s in the United Kingdom
1990s in the United Kingdom